Mikael Ruohomaa (born 17 November 1988) is a Finnish professional ice hockey player. He is currently playing for Leksands IF of the Swedish Hockey League (SHL).

Playing career
Ruohomaa made his SM-liiga debut playing with JYP Jyväskylä during the 2012–13 SM-liiga season.

On May 1, 2018, Ruohomaa left Finland for the first time in his professional career, signing as a free agent to a one-year contract with Russian outfit, HC Neftekhimik Nizhnekamsk of the KHL.

After notching 33 points in 49 games in his debut 2018–19 season in the KHL with Neftekhimik Nizhnekamsk, Ruohomaa opted to continue in Russia, signing an improved one-year contract with HC Sibir Novosibirsk on May 1, 2019.

Ruohomaa left the KHL following his second season with Sibir Novosibirsk in 2020–21 and signed a two-year contract with Swedish SHL club, Leksands IF, on 15 July 2021.

Career statistics

International

References

External links
 

1988 births
Living people
Finnish ice hockey centres
Jokipojat players
JYP-Akatemia players
JYP Jyväskylä players
KalPa players
KOOVEE players
Leksands IF players
Lempäälän Kisa players
HC Neftekhimik Nizhnekamsk players
Oulun Kärpät players
People from Loimaa
HC Sibir Novosibirsk players
Sportspeople from Southwest Finland